Félix Sánchez may refer to:

 Félix Sánchez (football manager) (born 1975), Spanish football manager
 Félix Sánchez (hurdler) (born 1977), Dominican track and field athlete
 Félix Sánchez Olympic Stadium, stadium in the Dominican Republic named after the athlete
 Félix Sánchez (baseball) (born 1981), Dominican baseball pitcher